Stenocorus flavolineatus is a species of beetle in the family Cerambycidae. It was described by John Lawrence LeConte in 1854.

References

Lepturinae
Beetles described in 1854